Abdelwahed Wahib (born 27 January 2000) is a Moroccan professional footballer who plays as a left-back for  club Le Havre.

Career 
A product of the Mohammed VI Academy, Wahib moved to Le Havre on 18 June 2019. Wahib made his professional debut with Le Havre in a 2–0 Ligue 2 win over Caen on 15 March 2021.

International career
Wahib represented the Morocco U17s for a pair of 2017 Africa U-17 Cup of Nations qualification matches against the Guinea U17s, scoring one goal.

References

External links
 
 HAC-Foot Profile

2000 births
Living people
Footballers from Casablanca
Moroccan footballers
Morocco youth international footballers
Association football fullbacks
Mohammed VI Football Academy players
Le Havre AC players
Ligue 2 players
Championnat National 2 players
Moroccan expatriate footballers
Expatriate footballers in France